Madasphecia griveaudi is a moth of the family Sesiidae. It is found in south-western Madagascar. It is only known from its male holotype that was caught at the Mahafaly Plateau.

References

Sesiidae
Moths described in 1982
Moths of Madagascar
Moths of Africa